The fifth season of Blue Bloods, a police procedural drama series created by Robin Green and Mitchell Burgess, premiered on CBS September 26, 2014, and concluded on May 1, 2015. Leonard Goldberg serves as executive producer. CBS had renewed the series for a fifth season on March 13, 2014, with a 22-episode order. The series aired its 100th episode ("Baggage") during the fifth season.

On May 11, 2015, CBS renewed Blue Bloods for a sixth season.

Cast
Donnie Wahlberg (Danny Reagan), Bridget Moynahan (Erin Reagan), Will Estes (Jamie Reagan) and Len Cariou (Henry Reagan) are first credited. Amy Carlson (Linda Reagan) and Sami Gayle (Nicky Reagan-Boyle) are credited next, marking the first season they have been included in the opening credits. Tom Selleck (Frank Reagan) receives an "and" billing at the close of the main title sequence.

Marisa Ramirez continued into season 5 as Danny's partner Detective Maria Baez, and she receives an "also starring" billing. Vanessa Ray, who was listed as a "special guest star" in season 4 as Jamie's partner Eddie Janko, receives "also starring" status for season 5. Appearing regularly and receiving "special guest star" billing are Gregory Jbara as Deputy Commissioner of Public Information Garrett Moore, Robert Clohessy as Lt. Sidney Gormley, and Abigail Hawk as Detective Baker, Frank's primary aide.

Main cast 
Tom Selleck as Police Commissioner Francis "Frank" Reagan
Donnie Wahlberg as Detective 1st Grade Daniel "Danny" Reagan
Bridget Moynahan as ADA Erin Reagan
Will Estes as Officer Jamison "Jamie" Reagan
Len Cariou as Henry Reagan
Amy Carlson as Linda Reagan
Sami Gayle as Nicole "Nicky" Reagan-Boyle
Marisa Ramirez as Detective 1st Grade Maria Baez 
Vanessa Ray as Officer Edit "Eddie" Janko

Recurring cast 
Abigail Hawk as Detective 1st Grade Abigail Baker
Gregory Jbara as Deputy Commissioner of Public Information Garrett Moore
Robert Clohessy as Sergeant/ Lieutenant Sidney "Sid" Gormley
Nicholas Turturro as Sargant Anthony Renzulli 
Bebe Neuwirth as Kelly Peterson  
Ato Essandoh as Reverend Darnell Potter 
Tony Terraciano as Jack Reagan 
Andrew Terraciano as Sean Regan

Broadcast
The season airs simultaneously on CTV in Canada. In Africa, it began airing on Dstv on October 23, 2014. In the United Kingdom and Ireland, it began on Sky Atlantic on November 5, 2014.

Episodes

Ratings

References

External links

2014 American television seasons
2015 American television seasons
Blue Bloods (TV series)